The 63rd annual Venice International Film Festival, held in Venice, Italy, was opened on 30 August 2006 with Brian De Palma's The Black Dahlia and was closed on 9 September 2006. Host of the event was Italian actress Isabella Ferrari.
During the festival, retrospectives were held on the one hundredth anniversary of the births of three major Italian directors: Roberto Rossellini, Mario Soldati and Luchino Visconti. The Golden Lion for Lifetime Achievement Award was presented to American director David Lynch. All the films running the contest were shown for the first time as world premiere in the festival history since the Second World War.

Juries
The international juries of the 63rd Venice International Film Festival were composed as follows:

Main Competition (Venezia 63)
Catherine Deneuve, French actress (Jury President)
Michele Placido, Italian actor and director
Juan Josè Bigas Luna, Spanish director and writer
Paulo Branco, Portuguese producer
Cameron Crowe, American director, screenwriter and producer
Chulpan Khamatova, Russian film, theater and TV actress
Park Chan-wook, South Korean director and screenwriter

Horizons (Orizzonti)
Philip Gröning, German director and screenwriter (President)
Carlo Carlei, Italian director
Giuseppe Genna, Italian writer
Keiko Kusakabe, Japanese producer and distributor
Yousry Nasrallah, Egyptian director

Opera Prima ("Luigi de Laurentiis" Award for a Debut Film)
Paula Wagner, American producer (President)
Stefania Rocca, Italian actress
Guillermo del Toro, Mexican director and screenwriter
Mohsen Makhmalbaf, Iranian director and producer
Andrei Plakhov, Russian critic

Short Film Competition (Corto Cortissimo)
Teboho Mahlatsi, South African director and producer (President)
Francesca Calvelli, Italian editor
Aleksey Fedorchenko, Russian director

Official selection

In competition
The competitive section of the official selection is an international competition of feature films in 35mm and digital HD format, running for the Golden Lion.

Highlighted title indicates the Golden Lion winner.

Out of competition
Works by directors already established in past editions of the Festival, and films deemed appropriate for a midnight screening.

Horizons
A section aiming to provide a picture of the new trends in cinema.

Highlighted title indicate the Horizons Awards for Best Film and Best Documentary respectively.

Corto Cortissimo
International competition of 35mm short films, in world premiere, not exceeding 30 minutes in length.

Highlighted title indicates Lion for Best Short Film winner.

The secret story of Russian cinema
Special monografic section on the Secret story of Russian cinema from 1934 to 1974.

Joaquim Pedro de Andrade 
This is a special section dedicated to the Brazilian movie-maker, Joaquim Pedro de Andrade, one of the fathers of new cinema and a famous renewal of Brazilian cinema. His daughter, Alice de Andrade, also a producer, restored the fourteen works that constitute all of her father's filmography.

Secret History of Italian Cinema 3
Special monographic sessions dedicated to the secret story of Italian film from 1937 to 1979. This is the third part of the retrospective of Italian Film, initiated at the 61st Venice International Film Festival.

Autonomous sections

Venice International Film Critics' Week
The following feature films were selected to be screened as In Competition for the 21st Venice International Film Critics' Week:

Venice Days
The following films were selected for the 3rd edition of Venice Days (Giornate Degli Autori) autonomous section:

Awards

Official selection
The following Official Awards were conferred at the 63rd edition:

In Competition (Venezia 63)
 Golden Lion: Sanxia haoren by Jia Zhangke
 Silver Lion for Best Director: Alain Resnais for Private Fears in Public Places
 Silver Lion Revelationr: Emanuele Crialese for Nuovomondo
 Special Jury Prize: Daratt by Mahamat Saleh Haroun
 Volpi Cup for Best Actor: Ben Affleck for Hollywoodland
 Volpi Cup for Best Actress: Helen Mirren for The Queen
 Marcello Mastroianni Award for Best Young Actor: Isild Le Besco for L'intouchable
 Award for Best Cinematography: Emmanuel Lubezki for Children of Men
 Award for Best Screenplay: Peter Morgan for The Queen
 Special Lion: Jean-Marie Straub and Danièle Huillet for their innovation in cinematographic languages

Special Awards
 Golden Lion for lifetime achievement: to David Lynch

Horizons awards (Premi Orizzonti)
 Best Film: Mabei shang de fating by Liu Jie
 Best Documentary: When the Levees Broke: A Requiem in Four Acts by Spike Lee

Short Film awards (Corto Cortissimo Lion)
 Silver Lion for Best Short Film: Comment on freine dans une descente? by Alix Delaporte
 UIP Award for the Best European Short Film: The Making of Parts by Daniel Elliott
Special Mention: Adults Only by Yeo Joon Han

Autonomous sections
The following official and collateral awards were conferred to films of the autonomous sections:

Venice International Film Critics' Week
 Best Film:: A Guide to Recognizing Your Saints by Dito Montiel
 Isvema Award: A Guide to Recognizing Your Saints by Dito Montiel

Venice Days (Giornate Degli Autori)
 Lion of the Future
Luigi De Laurentiis Award for a Debut Film: Khadak by Peter Brosens & Jessica Woodworth
Special mention: 7 Years (7 Ans) by Jean-Pascal Hattu
 Label Europa Cinemas: Dark Blue Almost Black (Azuloscurocasinegro) by Daniel Sánchez Arévalo
 Prize Arca Cinemagiovani (Young Cinema Award) – Best Movie "Other Visions": Offscreen by Christoffer Boe
 UAAR Award: Dark Blue Almost Black by Daniel Sánchez Arévalo
 Venice Authors Prize: Chicha tu madre by Gianfranco Quattrini & Mientras tanto by Diego Lerman

Other collateral awards
The following collateral awards were conferred to films of the official selection:

 FIPRESCI Award
Best Film (Main competition): The Queen by Stephen Frears
Best Film (Horizons): When the Levees Broke: A Requiem in Four Acts by Spike Lee
 SIGNIS Award: Golden Door (Nuovomondo) by Emanuele Crialese
Special mention: Dry Season (Daratt) by Mahamat Saleh Haroun
Special mention: Private Property (Nue Propriété) by Joachim Lafosse
 UNICEF Award: Golden Door by Emanuele Crialese
 UNESCO Award: Dry Season by Mahamat Saleh Haroun
 Francesco Pasinetti Award (SNGCI):
Best Actor: Sergio Castellitto for The Missing Star
Best Actress: Laura Morante for Private Fears in Public Places
Best Film: Golden Door by Emanuele Crialese
 Pietro Bianchi Award: Marco Bellocchio
 FEDIC Award: Golden Door by Emanuele Crialese
 Little Golden Lion: Euphoria by Ivan Vyrypaev
 Young Cinema Award – Best International Film: Black Book (Zwartboek) by Paul Verhoeven
 Wella Prize: Don't Make Any Plans for Tonight (Non prendere impegni stasera) by Gianluca Maria Tavarelli (Horizons)
 Open Prize: Dong by Jia Zhangke (Horizons)
 Doc/It Award (ex aequo): Dong by Jia Zhangke & I Am the One Who Brings Flowers to Her Grave by Hala Alabdalla Yakoub and Ammar Al Beik
 Future Film Festival Digital Award: Inland Empire by David Lynch (Out of competition)
Special mention: The Banquet by Feng Xiaogang (Out of competition)
 Laterna Magica Prize: Children of Men by Alfonso Cuarón
 Biografilm Award: Bobby by Emilio Estevez
Best Film: CinemAvvenire Award: Golden Door by Emanuele Crialese
Cinema for Peace Award: I Don't Want to Sleep Alone (Hei yanquan) by Tsai Ming-liang
 Award of the City of Rome: Lettere dal Sahara by Vittorio De Seta (Special Events)
 Human Rights Film Network Award: When the Levees Broke: A Requiem in Four Acts
Special mention: Dry Season by Mahamat Saleh Haroun
 EIUC Award: Dry Season by Mahamat Saleh Haroun
 Mimmo Rotella Foundation Award: The Missing Star (La stella che non-c'è) by Gianni Amelio
 Gucci Award: Nick Cave (screenplay) for The Proposition by John Hillcoat

The numbers and the nations of the 63rd Show
Number of countries with a film in one of the official sections: 31
Countries making their first appearance at the film festival Chad, Cyprus and Indonesia
Number of films displayed: 2,589, including 1,429 full-length feature films
Number of full-length feature film officially presented: 62
During the contest: 21
Out of the contest: 9 + 7 midnights + 1 special event
Venice Horizons: 19 + 5 special events

References

External links

Venice Film Festival 2006 Awards on IMDb

Venice Film Festival
Venice
Venice
Venice
Film
August 2006 events in Europe
September 2006 events in Europe